Peñarrubia is a Spanish municipality in the west of Cantabria. The La Hermida Gorge, the entrance to Liébana, is located within the town as well as the historic La Hermida Hotel and Spa. The Deva river crosses the town.

Municipalities in Cantabria